Pancheri is an Italian surname. Notable people with the surname include:

Aldo Pancheri (born 1940), Italian artist
Celestino Pancheri (c. 1881 – 1961), Italian sculptor
Franco Pancheri (born 1958), Italian footballer
Horacio Pancheri (born 1982), Argentine actor and model

Italian-language surnames